The Jigawa State College of Education and Legal Studies is a state government higher education institution located in Ringim, Jigawa State, Nigeria. The current Provost is Abbas A. Abbas.

History 
The Jigawa State College of Education and Legal Studies was established in 1992.

Courses 
The institution offers the following courses;

 English
 Economics
 Hausa
 Accountancy
 Primary Education
 Early Childhood Care Education
 Islamic Studies
 Arabic
 Computer Education
 History
 Social Studies
 Law

References 

Universities and colleges in Nigeria
1992 establishments in Nigeria